Ladislav Chudík (27 May 1924 – 29 June 2015) was a Slovak actor. He appeared in more than fifty films.

Selected filmography

Awards
 Czech Lion for Best Supporting Actor (2009)

References

External links
 

1924 births
2015 deaths
Slovak male film actors
Slovak male television actors
20th-century Slovak male actors
21st-century Slovak male actors
Czech Lion Awards winners